Hugh Hamilton may refer to:

Military
Hugh Hamilton, 1st Viscount of Glenawly (c. 1600–1678), Irish aristocrat, soldier in Swedish and English service
Baron Hugo Hamilton (died 1724), Swedish military commander and nephew of Hugh Hamilton, 1st Viscount of Glenawly
Hugh Hamilton (sailor) (1830–1890), American Civil War sailor and Medal of Honor recipient

Others
Hugh Douglas Hamilton (1740–1808), Irish artist
Hugh Hamilton (bishop) (1729–1805), mathematician, natural philosopher and Church of Ireland bishop
Hugh Hamilton (mayor), New Zealand former lawyer and mayor (of Central Hawke's Bay); convicted fraudster
Hugh Hamilton (rugby union) (1854–1930), Scotland international rugby union player
Hugh Hamilton (racing driver) (1905–1934), British racing driver